Antigoni Roumpesi or Antigoni Roumbesi (born 19 July 1983 in Athens) is a Greek water polo player, World Aquatics gold champion and Olympic silver medalist with the Greece women's national water polo team.

She received a silver medal at the 2004 Summer Olympics in Athens.

She received a gold medal with the Greece women's national water polo team at the 2005 FINA Women's Water Polo World League in Kirishi, where she also was top scorer with 31 goals.

At the 2007 FINA Women's Water Polo World League Roumpesi scored 21 goals and was ranked number 3 on the top scoring list, while the Greek team finished 4th in the competition.

At the 2010 Women's European Water Polo Championship in Zagreb Croatia, she scored 9 goals with the Greek team that won the silver medal.

At the water polo championship at the 2011 World Aquatics championships in Shanghai, China, Roumpesi scored 15 goals with the Greek team that won the gold medal.

At the 2012 Women's European Water Polo Championship in Eindhoven Netherlands, she won the silver medal with the Greek team.

See also
 Greece women's Olympic water polo team records and statistics
 List of Olympic medalists in water polo (women)
 List of world champions in women's water polo
 List of World Aquatics Championships medalists in water polo

References

External links
 

1983 births
Living people
Greek female water polo players
Olympic water polo players of Greece
Water polo players at the 2004 Summer Olympics
Water polo players at the 2008 Summer Olympics
Olympic silver medalists for Greece
Olympic medalists in water polo
Medalists at the 2004 Summer Olympics
World Aquatics Championships medalists in water polo
Water polo players from Athens